Goniopholis (meaning "angled scale") is an extinct genus of goniopholidid crocodyliform that lived in Europe and Africa during the Late Jurassic and Early Cretaceous. Being semi-aquatic it is very similar to modern crocodiles. It would have had a very similar lifestyle to the American alligator or Nile crocodile.

Discovery and species

The type species of the genus is G. crassidens which is known from the Berriasian of England, and the referable species G simus from the Berriasian of NW Germany, might be conspecific. Other species that are referable to Goniopholis include G. kiplingi from the Berriasian of England, and G. baryglyphaeus from the Late Jurassic (Kimmeridgian) of Portugal making it the oldest known Goniopholis species. The species G. kiplingi honors the author Rudyard Kipling, "in recognition for his enthusiasm for natural sciences". G. kiplingi had skull reaching , it is one of the largest goniopholidid along with Amphicotylus milesi which had skull reaching .

Eggs attributed to Goniopholis were found in the Late Jurassic of Portugal.

A partial skeleton of an indeterminate species of Goniopholis has been recovered from the Berriasian aged Angeac-Charente bonebed of France.

Goniopholis have been inferred to have been ectothermic on the basis of bone histology and stable isotope analysis.

Formerly assigned species
Two species were referred to Goniopholis from Brazil. Goniopholis hartti from the Lower Cretaceous of Brazil is in fact a member of the genus Sarcosuchus. G. paulistanus, based on two tooth crowns and a disassociated fragment of the right tibia from the Upper Cretaceous Bauru Group, has been reassigned to Itasuchidae and given its own genus Roxochampsa.

From North America, G. lucasii and G. kirtlandicus are currently placed in their own genera Amphicotylus and Denazinosuchus, respectively, while G. felix, G. gilmorei, and G. stovalli, all from the Morrison Formation, are referable to Amphicotylus and closely related to Eutretauranosuchus which are known from the same formation.

G. phuwiangensis is known from NE Thailand, but this species is fragmentary and was recently reassigned to Sunosuchus. Nannosuchus from the Early Cretaceous (Berriasian stage) of England and Spain currently considered to be valid, was referred to as G. gracilidens by some authors.

Willett's / Hulke's, Hooley's and Dollo's goniopholidids represent several complete specimens previously classified as either G. simus or G. crassidens, and one of them was recently re-described as the new species, G. willetti. More recently these specimens were removed from Goniopholis, and two of them, Hooley's and Hulke's goniopholidids, have been already reassigned to their own genera Anteophthalmosuchus and Hulkepholis, respectively. Dollo's goniopholidid has also been assigned to Anteophthalmosuchus.

Classification

Below is a cladogram including several Goniopholis  species:

References

Sources
 
 
 
 Owen, R. 1878. Monograph on The Fossil Reptilia of the Wealden and Purbeck Formations, Supplement no. VII. Crocodilia (Goniopholis, Pterosuchus, and Suchosaurus). Palaeontological Society Monograph, p. 1-15.
 
 
 

Early Cretaceous crocodylomorphs of Europe
Prehistoric reptiles of Africa
Late Jurassic crocodylomorphs of Europe
Early Cretaceous reptiles of Europe
Taxa named by Richard Owen
Fossil taxa described in 1841
Prehistoric pseudosuchian genera